Filyutino is a rural locality (a village) in Novlenskoye Rural Settlement, Vologodsky District, Vologda Oblast, Russia. The population was 112 as of 2002. There are 2 streets.

Geography 
Filyutino is located 64 km northwest of Vologda (the district's administrative centre) by road. Yeremeyevo is the nearest rural locality.

References 

Rural localities in Vologodsky District